Thomas Arthur "Touchdown Tommy" Vardell (born February 20, 1969) is a former professional American football fullback in the National Football League.

College career
Vardell was a star running back for the Stanford Cardinal. In 1990, he was given the nickname "Touchdown Tommy" by then Stanford head coach Denny Green after scoring four touchdowns (all from the one yard line) against Notre Dame.

For the Cardinal, Vardell rushed for 1,843 yards, scored 37 touchdowns, and never recorded a fumble in his college career. He ranks second in Stanford football history for most rushing touchdowns in a season and third for career rushing touchdowns. Vardell held the record for most rushing yards in a season by a Cardinal running back, with 1084 yards in 1991. His record was broken by Toby Gerhart in 2009 and subsequently Christian McCaffrey in 2015.

In 1990 as a junior, he carried the ball just 120 times for 441 yards but scored an impressive 14 TDs (1 TD every 9 carries).  As a senior, he would carry the ball 226 times for 1,084 yards and score 22 TD in only 11 games.

NFL career

NFL Draft

Vardell's performance for Stanford in 1991 resulted in him being one of the top draft picks in 1992 NFL draft. He was selected by the Cleveland Browns under then head coach Bill Belichick in the first round (9th overall) of the 1992 NFL Draft.

NFL career
In his first two years with the Browns, Vardell rushed for 1,013 yards on 270 carries and scored 3 TD. He would only play 10 games combined due to injuries in the 1994 and 1995 seasons. He signed as a free agent with the San Francisco 49ers in 1996, moved on to the Detroit Lions in 1997 and 1998, and then finished his career back with the 49ers in 1999.

In his pro career, Vardell played in eight NFL seasons as the fullback for the Browns, the Detroit Lions, and the San Francisco 49ers. He overcame a career threatening knee injury early in his career and retired in 1999 with 22 touchdowns.

He was the starting fullback when Barry Sanders rushed for 2,053 yards in the 1997–1998 NFL season.

NFL statistics
Rushing Stats

Receiving Stats

Business career
In 2000, upon retiring from football, Vardell and former teammates, Brent Jones, and Mark Harris co-founded Northgate Capital, a venture capital and private equity investment firm with approximately $4.9 billion of assets under management and offices in San Francisco, Danville, Mexico City and London, and served as its managing director and founding partner. He sold a majority stake in Northgate to Indian financial services company Religare Enterprises in 2010 and continued to manage the firm as a partner. In 2016, after Religare and Northgate's management team sold 100% ownership of the firm to The Capital Partnership, an investment advisor with offices in London and Dubai, he became an advisor.

Personal life
Vardell is married to Andrea Marie Cummings, with whom he has two children, Colton and Grace. They reside in the Bay Area.

Vardell was a member of the Sigma Nu fraternity at Stanford. In 1991 he was named Sigma Nu National Athlete of the Year.

References

1969 births
Living people
American football fullbacks
Stanford Cardinal football players
Cleveland Browns players
Detroit Lions players
San Francisco 49ers players
Players of American football from California
Sportspeople from El Cajon, California